Tajan Lateh may refer to:
 Tajan Lateh-ye Olya
 Tajan Lateh-ye Sofla